Local 58 is a horror web series created by cartoonist Kris Straub. The series is a spin off of Straub's Candle Cove creepypasta. Currently hosted on the YouTube channel LOCAL58TV, each video in the series is presented as footage of a fictional public access television channel located in Mason County, West Virginia named Local 58, with the call sign WCLV-TV, created in the late 1930s, which is continuously hijacked over a period of decades with a series of ominous and surreal broadcasts. 

The series makes use of video and audio degradation to add to the realism and unsettling nature of each video. The series describes itself as "analog horror", a term that has since been used as a name for a niche subgenre of similar VHS-themed found footage web series that were either inspired by Local 58 or use a similar style and techniques to the series.  The series has since gained a cult following.

A website called local58.tv was created in September 2021 as an extension of the main storyline. The website features a "LookBack Web Archive" similar to the web archive service Wayback Machine, and features numerous Easter eggs and plot points for an associated alternate reality game that offers further detail on Local 58s continuity.

Episodes 
Local 58 consists of ten episodes. The first nine range from less than 1 minute to 5 minutes in run time, while the tenth is nearly 30 minutes long. The episodes were originally uploaded to a separate website, however, as of late 2018, all episodes are now uploaded to YouTube.

Development and themes

Straub released Local 58's first episode, Weather Service, in 2015 as an experimental standalone piece for his co-owned YouTube channel Chainsawsuit Original. The piece received positive feedback, leading Straub to do two more on the same channel: Contingency and You Are On the Fastest Route. The series was also hosted on the now-defunct web domain local58.info in 2015 and was later uploaded onto its own YouTube channel in 2017. 

Straub used iMovie to create the first two episodes of Local 58 and Final Cut Pro X for the other episodes. All of the assets used in the series either come from public domain stock media (for example, the "2000's" Local 58 music, a stock track called "Entering Graciously") or created by Straub himself using Clip Studio, Adobe Photoshop and Adobe Flash.

Straub has confirmed on Reddit that Local 58 is the same "Channel 58" referenced in his creepypasta Candle Cove, which took the form of an Internet forum thread about a bizarre children's program of the same name airing on the network. The call sign WCLV is a reference to Candle Cove ("CLV = CandLe coVe"). Themes from other pieces of Straub's work appear in Local 58, such as the animated skeleton Cadavre, who appeared initially in Straub's webcomic Broodhollow and then in the Local 58 episode "Show for Children."

While the series does not appear to have a continuous plot, nearly every episode seems to include cryptic references related to looking at the Moon or at the night sky, as well as references to the in-universe organization known as the Thought Research Initiative (TRI). Straub has identified themes of the series as "stillness, distrust of safety warnings, misuse of mass perception, parallel science that arises from unexamined bad intent, dogmatic thought."

Reception 
Since its initial debut, Local 58 has inspired the creation of other series with similar themes, including Channel 7, Analog Archives, Eventide Media Center, and Gemini Home Entertainment. There is some difference of opinion about whether it was truly the first within its genre or an early example of a style that was already developing. However, critics agree the series categorically defined the conventions of the genre that would carry forward. Some also speculate it has indirectly influenced feature-length films such as Skinamarink (2022) which rely heavily on analog aesthetics.

As of December 2022, the Local 58 YouTube channel has over 558,000 subscribers and over 20 million views.

A subreddit dedicated to the series was created on August 8, 2016, which as of December 2022 has 25,400 followers. Straub himself has answered some questions about the series on the subreddit.

The emergency alert shown in Contingency has been compared to the 2018 Hawaii false missile alert.

Controversy 
On July 4, 2022, YouTube marked one Local 58 episode, "Show for Children," as "for kids", which disables user comments to comply with the Children's Online Privacy Protection Act. After Straub appealed YouTube's decision via in-site and other social media support avenues, it was reverted back to its original settings on July 6. This has sparked renewed discussions about Elsagate and concerns regarding YouTube's moderation algorithms.

See also 
Analog horror
Found footage (film technique)
Alternate reality game
The Blair Witch Project
Marble Hornets
The Mandela Catalogue
List of creepypastas

References

External links 
 Official Local 58 YouTube channel
 Entering Graciously, the song that is used in most of the Local 58 videos
 local58.tv

2015 web series debuts
2010s YouTube series
American web series
Fictional television stations
Horror fiction web series
Works by Kris Straub